Mariana Casas (Adrogué, August 27, 1959) is a lawyer of Argentina, she graduated from Universidad Nacional de Buenos Aires, she is a specialist in sexual identity rights and she represents before justice trans people who are looking for a gender adjustment surgery and a change of legal name.

She is a well known activist for women's rights, for sexual minorities rights and categories named LGBT.

Career
She assist Florencia de la V. in her recurso de amparo (writ of amparo) that accept her legal name.

References

20th-century Argentine lawyers
Argentine women lawyers
1959 births
Argentine LGBT people
Living people
21st-century Argentine lawyers